The Cyzicene epigrams are a collection of nineteen numbered Greek epigrams, each accompanied by a short prose preamble, which, together with a one-sentence introduction, constitute the third and shortest book of the Palatine Anthology. The epigrams are supposed to have been inscribed somewhere on the columns of the Temple of Apollonis  at Cyzicus, a monument which no longer exists. Apollonis was the wife and queen of Attalus I, first king of Pergamon. When she died in the mid-second century BC, two of her sons, Eumenes and Attalus, built a temple in Apollonis' home town of Cyzicus, and dedicated it to her.

According to the one-sentence introduction, each epigram was, apparently, a kind of subtitle for a relief decorating each column of the temple, illustrating a scene from Greek mythology. The prose preamble, taking the place of the carved image, provides a description of it. As befitting a temple built by sons to honor their mother, the preambles describe scenes of love between mothers and sons.

The author and date of the collection is unknown.

Notes

References
Demoen, Kristoffel, "The Date of the Cyzicene Epigrams. An Analysis of the Vocabulary and Metrical Technique of AP III", L'Antiquité Classique, 1988, T. 57 (1988), pp. 231-248. .
 Paton, W. R. (ed.), Greek Anthology, Volume I: Book 1: Christian Epigrams, Book 2: Description of the Statues in the Gymnasium of Zeuxippus, Book 3: Epigrams in the Temple of Apollonis at Cyzicus, Book 4: Prefaces to the Various Anthologies, Book 5: Erotic Epigrams, translated by W. R. Paton. Revised by Michael A. Tueller, Loeb Classical Library No. 67, Cambridge, Massachusetts, Harvard University Press, 2014. . Online version at Harvard University Press.
 Livingstone, Niall, and Gidean Nisbet, Epigram, Cambridge University Press, 2010. .

Ancient Greek literature